, also known by his Chinese style name , was a politician and bureaucrat of the Ryukyu Kingdom.

Seikei was born to an aristocrat family called Mō-uji Tomikawa Dunchi. In 1875, Sanshikan Giwan Chōho came under attack because of his pro-Japanese foreign policy and was forced to resign from public office. Seikei was selected as his successor. Unlike many Ryukyuan politicians, Seikei was neither pro-Japanese nor pro-Chinese.

Ryukyu had to break off diplomatic relations with Qing China under the pressure of Imperial Japan in 1876. Seikei went to Tokyo in 1878; he and his colleague Yonabaru Ryōketsu contacted envoys of Western countries and tried to get them involved, but there was little response. Two members of Sanshikan were gone to Japan and it was hard to manage internal affairs with only one Sanshikan. King Shō Tai had to choose Ikegusuku Anyū (also known as Mō Zōkō ), a former member of Sanshikan, to act on behalf of them in their absence.

Ryukyu was annexed by Japan in 1879, and later Japan declared the creation of Okinawa Prefecture. Because of his high prestige among Ryukyuan bureaucrats, Tomikawa Seikei was appointed an adviser of Okinawa Prefecture together with his college Urasoe Chōshō. But both of them wanted to restore the Ryukyu Domain. Seikei fled to Fuzhou together with Ō Taigyō (also known as Kokuba Pekumi ) in 1882. He went to Beijing, met Li Hongzhang several times, and submitted numerous petitions to Zongli Yamen asking for help on behalf of the kingdom. Though there was little response, he refused to give up. He became blind in his later years, and died in China.

See also
Kōchi Chōjō
Rin Seikō
Yoshimura Chōmei

References

People of the Ryukyu Kingdom
Ryukyuan people
19th-century Ryukyuan people
Blind people
Ueekata
Sanshikan
1832 births
1890 deaths